The Kelso Mountains are located just north of the small community of Kelso and the Kelso Dunes, in the Mojave National Preserve in southeastern California. The town of Baker, near Interstate 15, lies approximately 18 miles (29 km) to the northwest of the mountain range. Kelso Peak, at 4,764 feet (1,452 m), is the principal peak of the range. Like most of the Mojave Desert, the range is characterized by little rainfall, and usually receives less than 5–6 inches (125–150 mm) of precipitation in a normal year.

References

Mojave National Preserve
Mountain ranges of the Mojave Desert
Mountain ranges of Southern California
Mountain ranges of San Bernardino County, California